Chalsa Railway Station is the railway station which serves the town of Chalsa, Doars region in the Indian state of West Bengal. The station lies on New Jalpaiguri–Alipurduar–Samuktala Road line of Northeast Frontier Railway zone, Alipurduar railway division. Major Trains like New Jalpaiguri–Alipurduar Tourist Special., Siliguri–Alipurduar Intercity Express etc are available from this station.

References

Railway stations in West Bengal
Alipurduar railway division